is a former Japanese football player.

Playing career
Watanabe was born in Nagoya on September 28, 1969. After graduating from Osaka University of Commerce, he joined Yokohama Flügels in 1992. He played many matches as center back. In 1993 season, the club won the champions 1993 Emperor's Cup their first major title. At Final, he scored a winning goal in extra time. In 1995, the club won the champions 1994–95 Asian Cup Winners' Cup their first Asian title. At final, he scored 2 goals. In 1996, he moved to Júbilo Iwata. However he could not play at all in the match and he moved to newly was promoted to J1 League club, Vissel Kobe in 1997. From 1998, he played for Mito HollyHock (1998) and Yokohama FC (1999-2000). At Yokohama FC, the club won the champions for 2 years in a row (1999-2000) and was promoted to J2 League end of 2000 season. He retired end of 2000 season.

Club statistics

References

External links

1969 births
Living people
Osaka University of Commerce alumni
Association football people from Aichi Prefecture
Japanese footballers
J1 League players
Japan Football League (1992–1998) players
Japan Football League players
Yokohama Flügels players
Júbilo Iwata players
Vissel Kobe players
Mito HollyHock players
Yokohama FC players
Association football defenders